Sovetsky Tyumenskaya Airport  is an airport in Russia located 4 km south of Sovetsky, Khanty–Mansi Autonomous Okrug.

Airlines and destinations

References

External links

Airports built in the Soviet Union
Airports in Khanty-Mansi Autonomous Okrug